

Seasonal summary

Systems

Tropical Cyclone Steve

Tropical Cyclone Tessa

Tessa precursor tropical depression was first noted on December 5, while it was located in the southern Line Islands of Kiribati. Over the next couple of days, the system moved southeastwards and gradually intensified, before it was named Tessa by the FMS during December 7.

During December 9, the system moved in between Puka Puka and Reao as it continued to weaken and move south-eastwards towards the Gambier Islands. As the system moved through the Tuamotu Islands of French Polynesia, Tessa caused significant precipitation over the islands, with the Puka Puka weather station recording a 24-hour rainfall total of  during December 8.

Tropical Cyclone Anne

Over the next day the system moved south-westwards and passed within  of Futuna, before it was named Anne by the FMS during December 24, as satellite pictures showed that a tropical cyclone was developing. During December 25, the winds were indirectly estimated to be off gale-force, as it passed south-westwards through the Fijian Islands.

Severe Tropical Cyclone Bob

Severe Tropical Cyclone Charles

Tropical Cyclone Diana

During February 15, a tropical depression developed within the South Pacific Convergence Zone, to the west of French Polynesia's Society Islands. Over the next couple of days, the system moved eastwards towards Mopelia while gradually developing further, before it was named Diana by the FMS during February 16.

Tropical Cyclone Ernie

During that day, the system deepened as it moved south-eastwards towards Fiji before the FMS named it Ernie.

Severe Tropical Cyclone Hal

Season effects

|-
| Steve ||  || bgcolor=#|Category 2 tropical cyclone || bgcolor=#| || bgcolor=#| || || || ||
|-
| Tessa ||  || bgcolor=#|Category 1 tropical cyclone || bgcolor=#| || bgcolor=#| || || || ||
|-
| Anne ||  || bgcolor=#|Category 1 tropical cyclone || bgcolor=#| || bgcolor=#| || || || ||
|-
| Bob ||  || bgcolor=#|Category 3 severe tropical cyclone || bgcolor=#| || bgcolor=#| || || || || 
|-
| Charles ||  || bgcolor=#|Category 3 severe tropical cyclone || bgcolor=#| || bgcolor=#| || || || || 
|-
| Diana ||  || bgcolor=#|Category 2 tropical cyclone || bgcolor=#| || bgcolor=#| || || || ||
|-
| Ernie ||  || bgcolor=#|Category 2 tropical cyclone || bgcolor=#| || bgcolor=#| || || || ||
|-
| Hal ||  || bgcolor=#|Category 3 severe tropical cyclone || bgcolor=#| || bgcolor=#| || || || ||
|-

See also

Atlantic hurricane seasons: 1977, 1978
Eastern Pacific hurricane seasons: 1977, 1978
Western Pacific typhoon seasons: 1977, 1978
North Indian Ocean cyclone seasons: 1977, 1978

References

External links

 
South Pacific cyclone seasons
Articles which contain graphical timelines